Dead Presidents, Vol. 2 is the second soundtrack released for the film, Dead Presidents. It was released on April 2, 1996, through Capitol Records. After the success of the first soundtrack, Capitol Records decided to release a second soundtrack. However, this one failed to match the success of the first, only reaching #45 on the Top R&B/Hip-Hop Albums chart. Like the first, it consists of 1970s era funk and soul music.

Track listing

Personnel and credits
Executive-Producer – Albert Hughes, Allen Hughes, Darryl Porter
Executive-Producer [Co-Executive] – Bonnie Greenberg
Art Direction – Jeff Fey
Soundtrack Coordinator – Kim Niemi, Lisa Brown 
Design – Kevin Hosmann
Management – Ira Selsky, Jill Meyers
Mastered – Wally Traugott
Production Assistant – Annmarie Deringer, Tonya Sanders

Charts

Weekly charts

References 

Film soundtracks
1996 soundtrack albums
Capitol Records soundtracks